57 Geminorum (57 Gem) is a yellow giant star in the constellation Gemini, with an apparent magnitude of 5.0. With an age of about 1.2 billion years, it has evolved away from the main sequence and expanded to seven times the width of the Sun.

57 Geminorum is the star's Flamsteed designation.  It also has the rarely-used Bayer designation A Geminorum.

The radial velocity of 57 Geminorum has been closely examined for indications that it may have orbiting exoplanets, but it shows a particularly stable radial velocity.

References

Gemini (constellation)
Cassiopeiae, 57
2808
057727
035846
BD+25 1660
G-type giants
Geminorum, A